Gary William Taylor (born October 19, 1945) is a former baseball pitcher who appeared in seven games for the Detroit Tigers in 1969.

External links

1945 births
Living people
Detroit Tigers players
Statesville Tigers players
Rocky Mount Leafs players
Montgomery Rebels players
Toledo Mud Hens players
Central Michigan Chippewas baseball players
Baseball players from Michigan
Florida Instructional League Tigers players